Jared Clark (born 21 January 1998) is a footballer who plays as a centre-back for Croydon Kings. Born in Australia, he plays for the Vanuatu national team.

Club career
Clark is a youth product of the Australian clubs Western Strikers, Adelaide City and White City. He moved to Serbia with Vojvodina, and after three years in the country returned to Australia with Adelaide United. In 2019, he began his senior career with the semi-pro club Croydon Kings.

International career
Clark was born in Australia, and has Ni-Vanuatu descent through his mother. He was first called up to the preliminary 2020 OFC Nations Cup squad for Vanuatu national team, but the tournament was cancelled due to COVID-19. He debuted with Vanuatu in a friendly 3–0 loss to Fiji on 10 March 2022.

References

External links
 
 
 Jared Clark at Oceania Football Center

1998 births
Living people
Vanuatuan footballers
Vanuatu international footballers
Australian soccer players
Australian people of Vanuatuan descent
Association football defenders
Adelaide City FC players
FK Vojvodina players
Adelaide United FC players
Croydon Kings players
National Premier Leagues players
FK Beograd (Australia) players